Aleksandr Filin (born 25 June 1996) is a Russian footballer. He plays as a centre back for Belgian club Eupen.

Career

Club
In February 2015, Filin signed for FC Ufa. In August 2015 Filin took Russian citizenship.

On 22 February 2020, he joined Russian Premier League club Tambov on loan until the end of the 2019–20 season.

On 31 January 2023, Filin signed a 2.5-year contract with Eupen in Belgium.

Career statistics

References

1996 births
Sportspeople from Simferopol
Naturalised citizens of Russia
Living people
Ukrainian footballers
Russian footballers
Association football defenders
FC Shakhtar-3 Donetsk players
FC Ufa players
FC Nizhny Novgorod (2015) players
FC Khimki players
FC Tambov players
K.A.S. Eupen players
Ukrainian Second League players
Russian Premier League players
Russian First League players
Ukrainian expatriate footballers
Ukrainian expatriate sportspeople in Russia
Expatriate footballers in Russia
Russian expatriate footballers
Expatriate footballers in Belgium
Russian expatriate sportspeople in Belgium